Porjus power station is one of the oldest and largest power plants in Sweden, situated near Porjus. It was built 1910-1915 and has a power of 480 MW. Besides three-phase AC, the plant originally also generated single phase 15 Hz AC for railway traction and hence, two single-phase 80 kV power lines ran along the Iron Ore Line Malmbanan where it was transformed down to 16 kV in substations. However this system was later abandoned in favor of rotary converter stations. The original machines for single phase AC were subsequently scrapped.

The construction of the Porjus power station out in the wilderness is considered a pioneering achievement. The material for the founding work had to be carried in backpacks over a 44 km trail in uninhabited land before any infrastructure was built. In the early 1970s, a new power station was built but the old monumental brick building has been kept as a cultural heritage site with most of the machinery intact, with Vattenfall doing daily tours for visitors during the summertime. The station is actually the third largest. In 2016, its 10 MW generator was upgraded with a fast active magnetic bearing for testing.

Just downstream of the station is Harsprånget Hydroelectric power station. With 977 MW, it is the largest hydroelectric power station in Sweden.

References

External links

 
, illustrated description of the Iron Ore line and the Porjus Power Station

Hydroelectric power stations in Sweden
Vattenfall
Energy infrastructure completed in 1915